West Park Place is a national historic district located at Erie, Erie County, Pennsylvania.  It includes 12 contributing commercial buildings built between 1857 and 1865.  They are characterized as three-story brick buildings over a full basement in the Italianate style.  The buildings reflect Erie's mid-19th-century central business district.  The district includes the Bindernecht Block, Purcell Hardware Store and "Marble Front" building.  A number of the buildings were designed and built by John Hill, who also built the John Hill House in the West Sixth Street Historic District.

It was added to the National Register of Historic Places in 1980.

References

Commercial buildings on the National Register of Historic Places in Pennsylvania
Historic districts on the National Register of Historic Places in Pennsylvania
Italianate architecture in Pennsylvania
Buildings and structures in Erie, Pennsylvania
National Register of Historic Places in Erie County, Pennsylvania